This list is of Major Sites Protected for their Historical and Cultural Value at the National Level in the Province of Sichuan, People's Republic of China.

 

 
 
 
 
 

 

 
 

 
 
 

  

 

 

|}

See also

 Principles for the Conservation of Heritage Sites in China
 International Dunhuang Project

References

 
Sichuan